Maaten Bagush (Ma'aten Baggush) was a vast transit camp on the Mediterranean shore, near the Baggush Box ~50 km east of Mersa Matruh, Egypt. It was used by the British Forces during World War II.

Egypt in World War II
ar:ماطن باجوش